Variospora is a genus of crustose lichens, belonging to the family Teloschistaceae.

The genus was circumscribed in 2013 by Ulf Arup, Ulrik Søchting, and Patrik Frödén.

Species

Variospora aegaea 
Variospora aurantia 
Variospora australis 
Variospora cancarixiticola 
Variospora dolomiticola 
Variospora epierodens 
Variospora erythrina 
Variospora flavescens 
Variospora fuerteventurae 
Variospora glomerata 
Variospora latzelii 
Variospora macrocarpa 
Variospora paulii 
Variospora sororicida 
Variospora thallincola 
Variospora velana

References

External links

Teloschistales
Teloschistales genera
Lichen genera
Taxa described in 2013